Xyris marginata, commonly known as alpine yellow eye, was first collected by German-Australian botanist Ferdinand von Mueller in 1875. Xyris marginata is a monocot in the family Xyridaceae which is endemic to King Island (Tasmania) and Tasmania, commonly growing in button grass moorlands, at altitudes of up to 1070 meters (3,510.5 ft) above sea level.

Taxonomy
The etymology of the word Xyris has two sources. The Latin root of the word stems from iris, presumably as many of both of the monocot genera are renowned for their bright yellow flowers. Marginata refers to the tightly rolled leaf margins of the species.

There are four native species in Tasmania: Xyris marginata, Xyris muelleri, Xyris operculata, and Xyris tasmanica. They all occupy waterlogged soils and swamps with Xyris marginata thriving at the highest altitude. Xyris operculata is the only one not endemic to Tasmania.

Description
Xyris marginata grows on high altitude moors. Its most notable characteristics are its yellow flowers, its twisting stems, and the wavy margins found on the bracts of its inflorescence. The blade is 1 mm broad and thick; its base sheathing being 4–6 cm long; and the main stalk, coming from the roots, is between 15 and 55 cm long. It is perennial and forms small tussocks.

Xyris marginata, like all Tasmanian Xyridaceaes, flowers between November and January. The flower head is broader towards the top, almost forming a globe, the lateral sepals are turned inwards and rough in texture. The petals are rounded and a golden yellow colour. They have finely notched margins, for which X. marginata gets its name. The stamens are equipped with anthers protruding on short filaments, with hairy staminodes reaching towards its base. They have three branches which are shallowly channelled. There are minute margins projected out from these that may be difficult to see without a magnifying glass. Finally, the flower contains a three-lobed capsule that is hardened at the top. The leaves are thick, with a central rib, and are characteristically dark brown and shiny. The margins are rounded, except at the tip of the leaf which is awl shaped. They are spirally arranged from the bottom of the plant. The bracts are dark brown, becoming larger and broader as they ascend. Their outline is curved, irregularly torn, and darker in colour towards the centre.

Similar species
Plants in the family Xyridaceae are tufted herbs and usually perennial. The leaves ascend from the bottom of the plant and are arranged spirally. The flowers are spherical, and all Tasmanian varieties have yellow flowers. Typically, they will have three sepals, three petals, and three stamens. Altitude is also an important factor for determining the species, as it is unlikely that species other than Xyris marginata have the resilience to survive at high altitudes.

Xyris operculata (A) can be differentiated from Xyris marginata (B) by its slender and erect leaves, as opposed to the spring-like leaves of Xyris marginata. In addition, Xyris operculata has three stamens reduced to hairy tufts in addition to its three regular stamens. Xyris muelleri (C) has leaves curling upwards, which are pointed at the ends. The petals have consistent margins. Xyris tasmanica (D) has consistent margins similar to C, however, does not have leaves close to the head of the flower.

Distribution and habitat
{
  "type": "FeatureCollection",
  "features": [
    {
      "type": "Feature",
      "properties": {},
      "geometry": {
        "type": "LineString",
        "coordinates": [
          [
            144.71191414631906,
            -41.04621681452063
          ],
          [
            146.36425816453996,
            -41.53489852970309
          ],
          [
            146.9267582986504,
            -43.5039397003351
          ]
        ]
      }
    },
    {
      "type": "Feature",
      "properties": {},
      "geometry": {
        "type": "LineString",
        "coordinates": [
          [
            146.71582066453996,
            -41.13895022209568
          ],
          [
            146.90917977131906,
            -41.64007788355276
          ],
          [
            148.2802733872086,
            -41.42954786438338
          ]
        ]
      }
    }
  ]
}

Xyris marginata can be found in wet heaths in King Island, the north west, west coast, east coast, and south west. Button grass moorlands, on which Xyris marginata is commonly found, occupy approximately 14% of the state, including alpine areas in western and southwestern Tasmania, the highlands of north-eastern Tasmania, the lowland heath-land pockets in eastern, north-eastern and south-eastern Tasmania. Button grass moorlands are defined by the Tasmanian Government’s Department of Primary Industries, Parks, Water and Environment (DPIPWE) as “vegetation less than two meters in height, in which the hummock forming plant known as 'button grass' (Gymnoschoenus sphaerocephalus) is usually dominant or common”. This includes, but is not limited to Western button grass moorland, sparse button grass moorland on slopes, pure button grass moorland and button grass moorland with emergent shrubs.

As well as DPIPWE being aware of where Xyris marginata is located, other sources, such as Reid et al. (2005) claim they are also in the east of the island. The left section of the map and the section in the top right show where DPIPWE believe Xyris marginata to be located.

Ecology
The most characteristic feature of button grass marshes is the Gymnoschoenus sphaerocephalus (button grass), after which this category of moorland is named. The depth of the peat substrate in Tasmanian button grass moorlands greatly vary and can sometimes be eroded to only 1 cm thick. Below which there may be mineral soils but generally quartz gravels are more common.  Button grass moorlands can grow on flats, slopes, ridges, and mountain plateaus that are vulnerable to frequent fires. Characteristically the soils are infertile and drain poorly but approximately 272 vascular plant species are recorded for this type of moorland, of which one third are endemic to Tasmania.

Conservation
There are no specific conservation objectives for Xyris marginata. However, the moors are protected by DPIPWE. The majority of moor land is publicly owned and under DPIPWE’s jurisdiction. It is resistant to invasive weeds and controlled burning can takes place if required.

References

External links
https://www.utas.edu.au/dicotkey/dicotkey/aquat_mono/gXyris.htm
https://www.utas.edu.au/docs/plant_science/field_botany/species/monocots/xyridsp/xyrimarg.html

marginata
Endemic flora of Tasmania
Plants described in 1899